Violins at the Ball is a 1974 French drama film directed by Michel Drach. It was entered into the 1974 Cannes Film Festival where Marie-José Nat won the award for Best Actress.

Cast
 Jean-Louis Trintignant – Lui (Michel)
 Marie-José Nat – Elle (La femme et la mère de Michel) / Michel's wife
 Gabrielle Doulcet – La grand-mère
 David Drach – L'enfant
 Nathalie Roussel – La soeur de Michel / Michel's Sister
 Christian Rist – Le frère de Michel et le contestataire / Michel's Brother
 Yves Afonso – Le cameraman
 Yvon Yak – Le premier producteur
 Noëlle Leiris – La comtesse
 Luce Fabiole – La boulangère
 Malvina Penne – La réfugiée rousse
 Paul Le Person – Le premier passeur
 Guy Saint-Jean – Le second passeur
 François Leccia – Le jeune passeur
 Guido Alberti – Le producteur italien
 Hella Petri – La femme du producteur

References

External links

1974 films
1970s French-language films
1974 drama films
Films about film directors and producers
Films directed by Michel Drach
Films set in the 1940s
French drama films
1970s French films